Takeyama (竹山, "bamboo mountain") is a Japanese surname. Notable people with the surname include:

 Cunning Takeyama (born 1971) stage name of Takanori Takeyama
 Michio Takeyama (1903–1984), Japanese writer
 Takanori Takeyama (born 1971), member of the Japanese comedy duo Cunning (owarai)
 Shingo Takeyama (born 1984), Japanese baseball player
 Yō Takeyama (born 1946), Japanese screenwriter

See also
 8706 Takeyama, a main-belt asteroid

Japanese-language surnames